"Comin' Thro' the Rye" is a poem written in 1782 by Robert Burns (1759–1796). The words are put to the melody of the Scottish Minstrel "Common' Frae The Town". This is a variant of the tune to which "Auld Lang Syne" is usually sung—the melodic shape is almost identical, the difference lying in the tempo and rhythm.

Origin and meaning 

G. W. Napier, in an 1876 Notes and Queries, wrote:

The protagonist, "Jenny", is not further identified, but there has been reference to a "Jenny from Dalry" and a longstanding legend in the Drakemyre suburb of the town of Dalry, North Ayrshire, holds that "comin thro' the rye" describes crossing a ford through the Rye Water at Drakemyre to the north of the town, downstream from Ryefield House and not far from the confluence of the Rye with the River Garnock. When this story appeared in the Glasgow Herald in 1867, it was soon disputed with the assertion that everyone understood the rye to be a field of rye, wet with dew, which also fits better with other stanzas that substitute "wheat" and "grain" for "rye". An alternative suggestion is that "the rye" was a long narrow cobblestone-paved lane, prone to puddles of water.

While the original poem is already full of sexual imagery, an alternative version makes this more explicit. It has a different chorus, referring to a phallic "staun o' staunin' graith" (roughly "an erection of astonishing size"), "kiss" is replaced by "fuck", and Jenny's "thing" in stanza four is identified as her "cunt".

Burns' lyrics

weet – wet
draigl't – draggled
gin – given, in the sense of "if"
cry – call out [for help]
warl – world
ken – know
ain – own

Lyrics usually sung ("Ilka lassie")
Even the "cleaner" version of the Burns lyrics is quite bawdy, and it is this one, or an "Anglized" version of it, that is most commonly "covered".

The Catcher in the Rye
The title of the novel The Catcher in the Rye (1951) by J. D. Salinger comes from the poem's name. Holden Caulfield, the protagonist, misremembers the line of the poem as, "if a body catch a body," rather than, "if a body meet a body." He keeps picturing children playing in a field of rye near the edge of a cliff, and himself catching them when they start to fall off.

Cover versions
The first recording of this song was made in 1906 by Ruth Vincent.
The song was sung by Marcella Sembrich in 1912.
The song was sung by Marian Anderson in 1944
The song was covered by Bill Haley & His Comets in 1956 as "Rockin' Through The Rye". Bill Haley had updated the lyrics to a more 1950's hip slang (including the lyrics, "All the lassies rock with me when rockin' through the rye"). In September 1956, when the record was climbing the UK charts, the single was banned by the BBC from its playlist because they felt the song went against traditional British standards. Nevertheless, the record peaked at No. 3 on the UK chart.
The song is covered by Alvin and the Chipmunks for their 1960 album Around the World with The Chipmunks.
Bing Crosby included the song in a medley on his album 101 Gang Songs (1961)
The song was sung by The Real McKenzies for their 2005 album 10,000 Shots.
The song is sung by Ava Gardner in the 1953 John Ford film Mogambo.
Jo Stafford covered the song on her album Songs of Scotland.
The song was parodied by Allan Sherman on his 1963 album My Son, the Celebrity.
The song is sung by Julie London on her 1959 album, Swing Me an Old Song.
Eddi Reader, Sings the Songs of Robert Burns (Deluxe Edition), 2009.
 John C. Reilly sang the song on a special whiskey-themed episode of Bob Dylan's Theme Time Radio Hour in 2020.

References

External links
 Digitised copy of Comin' thro' the rye in James Johnson's Scots Musical Museum , "Written for this Work by Robert Burns", printed between 1787 and 1803. Published online by National Library of Scotland. JPEG, PDF, XML versions.
 Public domain recording (1914) by Alma Gluck

Poetry by Robert Burns
1782 poems
1782 songs
1782 in Scotland
Children's songs
Scottish folk songs
Jeanette MacDonald songs